Mary Stuart Gile (née Sinclair; March 24, 1936 – October 15, 2019) was a Canadian-born American politician from New Hampshire.

Born and raised in Montreal, Quebec, Canada, she attended public schools, and graduated from McGill University with a B.Sc. in physical education, health and recreation. She moved to the United States and became a naturalized United States citizen in 1969. She worked for the State of New Hampshire for 16 years, acquiring her M.Ed. from the University of New Hampshire and an Ed.D. in educational leadership from Vanderbilt University's George Peabody College. She married her second husband, Robert "Bob" Gile, becoming stepmother to his son, Jack. In 1976, the couple had a child together, Robert.

She was a member of the New Hampshire House of Representatives, sitting as a Democrat from the Merrimack 27 district, having been first elected in 1996.

Death
Mary Stuart Gile died on October 15, 2019 of cancer, according to her husband, Bob Gile.

References

1936 births
2019 deaths
Anglophone Quebec people
Politicians from Concord, New Hampshire
Politicians from Montreal
Canadian emigrants to the United States
McGill University Faculty of Education alumni
University of New Hampshire alumni
Vanderbilt University alumni
Academics from New Hampshire
Democratic Party members of the New Hampshire House of Representatives
Women state legislators in New Hampshire
People with acquired American citizenship
Deaths from cancer in New Hampshire